Norgesbuss AS is a Norwegian bus company that operates in Akershus and Oslo. Norgesbuss has 450 buses, 900 employees and is owned by Torghatten ASA.  The company operates on public service obligation contracts with Ruter, in addition to the Airport Express with the franchise NOR-WAY Bussekspress between Oslo and Oslo Airport, Gardermoen.

References

Bus companies of Viken
Bus companies of Oslo
Companies based in Viken
Public transport in Viken
Torghatten ASA
Nor-Way Bussekspress operators